Kądziołka is a Polish surname, and may refer to

 Andrzej Kądziołka (born 1960), Polish ice hockey player
 Beata Kądziołka, former name of Beata Zawadzka (born 1986), Polish chess player
 Franciszek Kądziołka (1926–1983), Polish cinematograph
 Stanisław Kądziołka (1902–1971), Polish military patrol runner